The Harbinger is a 2022 American horror film directed by Andy Mitton, starring Gabby Beans, Emily Davis and Raymond Anthony Thomas.

Cast
 Gabby Beans as Monique
 Emily Davis as Mavis
 Raymond Anthony Thomas as Ronald
 Myles Walker as Lyle
 Cody Braverman as Edward
 Jay Dunn as Jason
 Stephanie Roth Haberle as Crystal
 Laura Heisler as Wendy

Release
The film premiered at the Fantasia International Film Festival on 20 July 2022. The film was released in theatres on 1 December 2022.

Reception
On review aggregator Rotten Tomatoes, The Harbinger holds an approval rating of 92%, based on 26 reviews, and an average rating of 7.60/10.

Nick Allen of RogerEbert.com wrote that the film is "more claustrophobic than your regular haunted house thriller, and the story does more than just use COVID as a familiar plot point, as it seeks to get underneath the feeling of trying to avoid it" and that Beans "gives an immersive and emotional performance". Dennis Harvey of Variety wrote that the film "disappoints only in that it’s good enough to make you wish it were better — that it left an indelible impression rather than a slightly vague one", and that "atmospherically, it does a lot with little, never feeling claustrophobically confined by the very ordinary, even drab lockdown interiors", which are occasionally "broken up by snowy exteriors that are no more welcoming in Ludovica Isidori’s adept cinematography." Mary Beth McAndrews of Dread Central rated the film 4.5 stars out of 5 and wrote that Mitton "illustrates how you can make a scary yet sensitive pandemic horror film that cuts to the core of the hell that has been the last two years." Joel Harley of Starburst rated the film 4 stars out of 5 and wrote that Mitton "uses his characters’ loneliness and increased fragility as a springboard to tell a story about Corona and its continued impact" and called the film's main antagonist "instantly memorable"and "a modern Boogeyman for an age of lockdowns, surgical masks and raging pandemics." Joe Lipsett of Bloody Disgusting rated the film 3.5 skulls out of 5 and wrote that the film "excels at striking a balance between fantastical genre elements and topical real-world concerns."

References

External links
 
 

2022 films
2022 horror films
2020s English-language films
2020s supernatural horror films
American horror films
American supernatural horror films
Films about the COVID-19 pandemic